Free Floating is a 2006 Russian comedy film directed by Boris Khlebnikov.

Plot 
The film tells about a 20-year-old guy who lives in a small town in which the only factory is suddenly closed. He works in the market, goes to various discos and constantly receives rejections about employment. And suddenly he sees a barge that will take him away from here.

Cast 
 Aleksandr Yatsenko as Lyonya
 Evgeniy Sytyy as Brigade-leader Roslov
 Pyotr Zaychenko as Elderly man from brigade
 Boris Petrov as Big man from brigade
 Darya Ekamasova as Piggy
 Nina Semyonova as Lyonya's mother
 Tagir Rakhimov as Poor man
 Sergey Nasedkin as Foreman Volodya
 Vladimir Tereshchenko as Vitya
 Dmitri Shvetsov as Andrei

References

External links 
 

2006 films
2000s Russian-language films
Russian romantic comedy-drama films
2006 romantic comedy-drama films